The siege of Lankaran ( —) took place on 1 January 1813 as part of the Russo-Persian War (1804-1813). The siege was noted for its bitterness and cruelty.

After a siege of five days, which included the shelling of the place, the Russians managed to storm the citadel, despite an Iranian numerical superiority. Though the Russians suffered heavy losses in the siege, which killed most of their officers and non-commissioned officers, they took the Persian fortress and thereby Lankaran.

After the Russians had taken the fortress, they executed all of the survivors and took no captive. General Pyotr Kotlyarevsky himself had become heavily injured during the siege and could no longer participate. Sadiq Khan, the Persian commander, had been killed during the siege of the fortress. Of the besieging 296-strong Russian 17th Jaeger regiment, only 74 of them survived the battle.

Lankaran citadel
In the course of the ongoing Russo-Persian War (1804-1813), the British managed to build a strong fortress in Lankaran.  According to eyewitnesses, "she made a strong impression by high stone walls and rows of sharp teeth". Furthermore, the citadel was surrounded by deep trenches. It had a shape of an irregular quadrilateral (80 fathoms width), with the left bank of the River Lankaranki, which is not far from the Caspian Sea, in the marshes nearby the citadel. Most of the southwest side stretched up for up to 130 meters long. The length of the northeast side, built in the shape of an irregular polygon, stretched up to 80 meters. The south-east side (along the river and towards the Caspian Sea) and from the northwest (from the front to the villages of Gamushevani were 100 meters long each. Besides, on each corner were bastions. The most imposing of them were the ones from the northeastern side. The ditch in front of the citadel was 4 meters deep and 10 meters in width.

Background
After several years of stale combat in various regions of Transcaucasia, with neither parties making significant territorial gains, the Russians had gained the upper hand and reached territories close to Persia's heartlands. On December 18, 1812 the marching military detachment of general Kotlyarevsky had crossed the Aras river and had passed the 80 miles straight without water and roads through the Mughan plains through salt flats and swamps. After crossing swamps and marshes, the soldiers were then transferred to a weather of terrible snow and blizzard. By then, his army had undergone a heavy need for resupplies especially drinking water and food.

On December 20, Russian detachment came across Shahsevan, which were often often to flee, and some were captured. The Russians confiscated their cattle.

By December 21, Kotlyarevsky's squad had reached the Talysh Khanate where they encountered 500 Persian horsemen, commanded by Abusalema. The horsemen and the Abusalema evaded combat and retreated to Arkivan.
Subsequently, the Russian avant-garde met the cavalry sardar Pir-Quli-Khan and a detachment of 1000 Persian soldiers. After a brief exchange of fire, the retreating Persians were pursued by Cossacks.

On December 22, Kotlyarevsky left Karayazı to cover the rear of the rear guard under the command of Major Dyachkova and the 200 infantrymen, 170 Cossacks, several horses from Karabakh, and one field gun, and went to Arkivan. With the rearguard also remained the freed Karabakh families and the Shahsevan prisoners taken captive several days earlier.

The garrison of Arkivan (holding 1500 Persian soldiers and 400 Russian deserters who had joined the Persian ranks) under the command of Bala Khan and Asghar Khan left the town's its fortress, leaving behind two field guns, with all the artillery reserve provisions and forage. For the pursuit of the Persians, Kotlyarevsky sent 400 Jaegers and 300 Cossacks under the command of Lieutenant Colonel Ushakov, who subsequently followed the Persians for 15 miles.

In the course of the pursuit, 50 of the 400 Russian deserters surrendered and up to 300 Persians were killed. The Russians subsequently seized more than 600 horses and a considerable baggage. The damage to the pursuing party amounted up to 1 dead and 5 wounded. To protect Arkivani 100 Jaegers were left stationed, who were in the greatest need of the rest.

Mir Mustafa Khan, having learned about the movement of the Russian troops after the defeat of the Persian army at Aslanduz, quickly went to Gamushevan, in which he had rebuilt warm barracks, stables and barns for the horses and the cattle and filled it with all the other necessary provisions.

Having entered an area administered by the Khan of the Talysh Khanate, Kotlyarevsky announced to its residents:

That statement by Kotlyarevsky influenced some of the Talysh, who subsequently began to cut the forest at which the Persian fugitives were reportedly hiding.

Taking of Lankaran

Siege

Sadiq Khan was garrisoned in Lankaran's fortress with an army comprising 4000 men. Abbas Mirza, the Persian crown prince and the  commander-in-chief of the Persian army, sent him a mandate:

This letter was read to all the officers and soldiers inside the Persian garrison, which shouted unanimously in agreeance of the crown prince's words:

Sadiq Khan also urged all residents to take up arms and take all necessary measures to protect the fortress. For approachments from the north and west squadrons were installed. Fearing a Russian surprise attack, Sadiq Khan ordered the supervision of the young officers and soldiers, and he closely followed the movements of the enemy.

On December 27, Kotlyarevsky sent Sadiq Khan a letter with a proposal to surrender Lankaran:

The same day, Sadiq Khan responded:

Having read the above letter, Kotlyarevsky ordered the bombardment the fortress. For a more effective attack, the nearby combat artillery ship to shore was to use its mortars as well. From December 28 to December 29, the Russian battery constantly bombarded the fortress but without much success, as the small shells of the field guns could not penetrate the strong walls layered with adobe and the men on the fortress manning the cannons on the garrison took refuge in their hideouts and attached a sloping to the inner side of the parapet. Seeing the futility of the shelling, Kotlyarevsky sent to Lankaran a secondary letter urging the Khans and officials of the garrison to spare themselves, their wives, their children and their property without shedding of blood by handing over the fortress. Kotlyarevsky also wrote:

Sadiq Khan did not consider it necessary to reply to that letter.

Meanwhile, the position of the Russian detachment became critical. The artillery shells had been emptied, and the people suffered from the cold. In addition, news got received that Abbas Mirza, the commander of all the Persian armies, was heading on its way to rescue Lankaran. Kotlyarevsky decided to waste no time and to take the fortress by storming it.

Storming

At the mentioned dispositions: - do not listen to rebound, there will not be one...

The storming of Lankaran by the Russians began long before dawn, at 5 a.m. The above-mentioned columns moved in the deepest silence, but the Persians had been alerted and so they opened heavy fire from all guns and rifles. However, the columns crossed the ditch quickly, and the soldiers, after they had put up a ladder, climbed the wall towards the exposed peaks and started throwing down grenades. In the first series of losses, almost all officers were killed or wounded. The 1st column saw the death of Lieutenant Colonel Ushakov, as he had hesitated for a time. Kotlyarevsky afterwards, despite receiving a leg injury, stood over the body of Ushakov, held his hand and ordered, "Here to me!" He personally threw himself into the assault but soon received two bullet wounds in the head and rolled into the ditch.

The Russian soldiers, deprived of their commanders, still continued the attack. The Azerbaijani educator and teacher Teymur Bey Bajram Alibayov described the events as follows: 

Meanwhile, the columns storming the fortress were significantly thinned out, as the walls were continuously replenished with new defenders. A company of grenadiers managed to climb the wall and to grab a weapon, which it immediately turned and fired buckshot at the enemy inside. That facilitated the attack of the other two columns, which also managed to climb the wall and to the sides and to overturn the enemy. Subsequently, as a significant number of Russians managed to get inside the fortress, a brutal melee happened between the attackers and the defenders. The Persian historian Rovzet-ul Safa described the events: 
Тeymur bey wrote:  

The remaining defenders of the citadel tried to find refuge in the river but were met with grapeshot from two Russian cannons mounted on the right side under the cover of 80 riflemen. Returning, the fugitives were met with bayonets of the besieging soldiers.

The Persian garrison was completely cut off. No prisoners were taken. Aksom Sadiq, the commander of the fortress, and about ten noble khans were killed.

Kotlyarevsky was found under the dead bodies. Fluid leaked out of his right eye, he had a fractured jaw and a bullet in his upper leg but had remained alive.

See also
 Battle of Sultanabad
 Battle of Aslanduz

References 

Battles involving Russia
Battles involving Qajar Iran
Conflicts in 1813
19th century in Azerbaijan
1813 in the Russian Empire
Lankaran
1813 in Iran
19th century in Iran
History of Lankaran
January 1813 events
History of Talysh